Lomaspilis is a genus of moths in the family Geometridae erected by Jacob Hübner in 1825.

Description
Lomaspilis species have a wingspan reaching . Males have simple or fasciculate-ciliate antennae. Forewings have convexly curved outer margins. They are usually white or ochreous white, with dark bands and blotches. Hindwings usually are showily patterned. The basic color is white or ochreous white, with a dark fuscous marginal band. In the early stages larvae feed on willows (Salix species).

Species

 Lomaspilis albociliata
 Lomaspilis albomarginata
 Lomaspilis amurensis
 Lomaspilis andrearia
 Lomaspilis artoni
 Lomaspilis bithynica
 Lomaspilis brunnescens
 Lomaspilis conflua
 Lomaspilis demarginata
 Lomaspilis diluta
 Lomaspilis discocellularis
 Lomaspilis dumeei
 Lomaspilis hjordisi
 Lomaspilis hortulata
 Lomaspilis huenei
 Lomaspilis kumakurai
 Lomaspilis lacticolor
 Lomaspilis limbata
 Lomaspilis maculata
 Lomaspilis marginaria
 Lomaspilis marginata
 Lomaspilis mediofasciata
 Lomaspilis naevaria
 Lomaspilis nigrita
 Lomaspilis nigrofasciata
 Lomaspilis nigrosparsata
 Lomaspilis nigrounicolorata
 Lomaspilis opis
 Lomaspilis pollutaria
 Lomaspilis postalbata
 Lomaspilis semialbata
 Lomaspilis staphyleata
 Lomaspilis subdeleta
 Lomaspilis suffusa
 Lomaspilis wendlandtiata

References

Abraxini
Taxa named by Jacob Hübner